Golshanabad may refer to:
 Golshanabad, Aran va Bidgol, Isfahan Province
 Golshanabad, Tiran and Karvan, Isfahan Province
 Golshanabad, Markazi
 Golshanabad, Chenaran, Razavi Khorasan Province
 Golshanabad, Firuzeh, Razavi Khorasan Province
 Golshanabad, Joghatai, Razavi Khorasan Province
 Golshanabad, Quchan, Razavi Khorasan Province

See also
Gulshanabad (disambiguation)